Haris Mujezinović (born 21 January 1974) is a Bosnian former professional basketball player. He played at the power forward position.

College career
Mujezinović played high school basketball at Amundsen High School in Chicago, Illinois. After high school, he played college basketball at the Joliet Junior College from 1993 to 1995.  He then transferred to Indiana University Bloomington, where he was a member of the Indiana Hoosiers, from 1995 to 1997.

Professional career
Mujezinović played professionally in Croatia (Šibenik, Cibona), Italy (Libertas Forli, Fortitudo Bologna, Benetton Treviso), Turkey (Kombassan Konya, Galatasaray, Darüşşafaka), Greece (Panathinaikos, Panionios), Slovenia (Union Olimpija), Switzerland (SAV Vacallo Basket), Russia (Dynamo Moscow), Bulgaria (PBC Academic), Cyprus (AEL Limassol), Ukraine (Kyiv), Lithuania (Lietuvos rytas) and Spain (Valencia).

National team career
Mujezinović played for the national basketball team of Bosnia and Herzegovina. He has played at the EuroBasket 1997, EuroBasket 1999, EuroBasket 2001 and EuroBasket 2003.

References

External links
EuroLeague profile

1974 births
Living people
ABA League players
AEL Limassol B.C. players
BC Dynamo Moscow players
BC Kyiv players
BC Rytas players
Bosnia and Herzegovina expatriate basketball people in the United States
Bosnia and Herzegovina men's basketball players
Fortitudo Pallacanestro Bologna players
Galatasaray S.K. (men's basketball) players
Indiana Hoosiers men's basketball players
KK Cibona players
KK Olimpija players
KK Šibenik players
Liga ACB players
Lega Basket Serie A players
Pallacanestro Treviso players
Panathinaikos B.C. players
Panionios B.C. players
PBC Academic players
People from Visoko
SAV Vacallo Basket players
Valencia Basket players
Power forwards (basketball)